Randy Hart (born March 9, 1948) is a former American football player and coach, earning national championships as both a player and coach.

He served as a college assistant coach for over forty seasons including over twenty at the University of Washington.  Hart primarily served as a defensive line coach during his career.

High school
Hart was a three-time letterman in football, wrestling and track at South High School in Willoughby, Ohio.

College
Hart earned three letters as an offensive guard on the Ohio State Buckeye football team under coach Woody Hayes. He graduated with a bachelor's degree in education in 1970, then earned a master's degree in higher education administration in 1972.

Coaching career

Hart coached under four College Football Hall of Fame members: Woody Hayes, Earle Bruce, Jim Young, and Don James. Hart's participation in 10 Rose Bowls are the second most in the game's history.  Hart retired from coaching after the conclusion of the 2015 season.

References

External links
 Washington profile
 Stanford profile

1948 births
Living people
American football offensive guards
Iowa State Cyclones football coaches
Notre Dame Fighting Irish football coaches
Ohio State Buckeyes football coaches
Ohio State Buckeyes football players
Purdue Boilermakers football coaches
Stanford Cardinal football coaches
Tampa Spartans football coaches
Washington Huskies football coaches
People from Willoughby, Ohio
Players of American football from Ohio